Chastel may refer to:

Communes in France 
 Chastel, Haute-Loire, in the Haute-Loire department
 Chastel-Arnaud, in the Drôme department
 Chastel-Nouvel, in the Lozère department
 Chastel-sur-Murat, in the Cantal department

People 
 André Chastel (1912–1990), French art historian
 Guigues du Chastel (1083–1136), legislator of the Carthusian Order and ascetical writer
 Jean Chastel (1708–1790), a farmer and innkeeper who killed the Beast of Gévaudan
 Louis Pierre Aimé Chastel (1774–1826), French general of the Napoleonic Wars
 Olivier Chastel (born 1964), Belgian politician
 Tanneguy du Chastel (1369–1449), French military leader of the Hundred Years' War

See also 

 Chatel (disambiguation)
 Chateau (disambiguation)
 Chatelain (disambiguation)
 Chatelaine (disambiguation)